Eudemis profundana, common name diamond-back marble, is a moth of the family Tortricidae.

Description
Forewings are rather broad and rounded. The coloration is quite variable, ranging from dark brown to reddish, with greyish marbling and a large whitish dorsal patch. The upper edge of this patch is not deeply indented and the basal fasciae are developed also dorsally. These moths also show a raised reddish-brown mane and unusual starry eyes. They have one brood per year (univoltine). The larvae feed on Quercus and Malus species. They roll a leaf of their host and feed within. Adults are on wing from July to August.

Distribution
This species can be found in most of Europe (except Iceland, Croatia and Greece). It is also found in the Near East.

Habitat
Eudemis profundana lives in various habitats, mainly in the deciduous woodland, but also in gardens.

External links
 UKMoths
 Fauna Europaea
 Hantsmoths
 Lightscapes
 Animalphotos
 Lotmoths

Moths described in 1775
Olethreutini
Moths of Europe
Moths of Asia